"Boy Looka Here" is the second single from the self-titled debut album by rap artist Rich Boy. The single was produced by Polow da Don. The video features the Omega Psi Phi, Tuskegee University and Alabama A&M University marching band. The song was used in an Extreme Exposé segment at World Wrestling Entertainment's pay-per-view No Way Out in February 2007. The song was also featured in the film Rocky Balboa. The video for the song was released in February 2007.

Critical reception
Jonathan Ringen of Rolling Stone called it a "standout" on the album, praising Polow da Don for his ability to "mix[es] flamenco guitar, haunted-house synths and a Reznor-hard beat into a menacing banger". J-23 of HipHopDX put it alongside "Touch That Ass" as highlights that "display[s] Polow's dynamic production and Rich's style." Reptilia of AbsolutePunk called it "a fantastic marching band-based number and an interesting tribute to the South's love of marching bands and football."

Remixes
Remix featuring Ja Rule and Harry-O
Remix featuring Rasheeda
Freestyle by Joe Budden
Freestyle by Crooked I and The Horshoe Gang

Charts

References

2008 singles
Rich Boy songs
Interscope Records singles
Song recordings produced by Polow da Don
Songs written by Polow da Don
2008 songs